Ali ibn Mohammed al-Jurjani (1339–1414) (Persian ) was a Persian encyclopedic writer and traditionalist theologian. He is referred to as "al-Sayyid al-Sharif" in sources due to his alleged descent from Ali ibn Abi Taleb. He was born in the village of Ṭāḡu near Astarabad in Gorgan (hence the nisba "Jurjani"), and became a professor in Shiraz. When this city was plundered by Timur in 1387, he moved to Samarkand, but returned to Shiraz in 1405, and remained there until his death. 

The author of more than fifty books, of his thirty-one extant works, many being commentaries on other works, one of the best known is the Taʿrīfāt (تعريفات "Definitions"), which was edited by G Flügel (Leipzig, 1845), published also in Constantinople (1837), Cairo (1866, etc.), and St Petersburg (1897).

See also
 List of people from Gorgan

References

External links

 (PDF version)

Hanafis
Maturidis
Asharis
1339 births
1414 deaths
14th-century Persian-language writers
15th-century Persian-language writers
People from Gorgan
14th-century Muslim theologians
15th-century Muslim theologians
Scholars from the Timurid Empire
14th-century Iranian people
15th-century Iranian people